Cumbum Valley, also called Kambam Valley, is a valley in the Theni district of Tamil Nadu state in India near the Kerala state border. This is the most fertile valley in south India, The valley includes lands between Thekkadi Hills, Varusanadu Hills, and Kodaikanal Hills.

It is one of the few places in Tamil Nadu producing grapes. Cumbum valley produces about 90,000 tonnes of muscat grapes and 10,000 tonnes of Thomson seedless grapes every year.

Places 
 Cumbum
 Chinnamanur
 Gudalur
 Lower Camp
 Surulipatti
 Kamaya Koundan Patti
 Hanumanthanpatty
 Pudupatty
 Rayappanpatty
 Anaimalayanpatty
 Ramasamynayakkanpatti
 Paramathevanpatti

References 

Theni district
Valleys of India
Landforms of Tamil Nadu